Tempo (stylized in all caps) is an Indonesian weekly magazine that covers news and politics. It was founded by Goenawan Mohamad and Yusril Djalinus and the first edition was published on 6 March 1971.

History

New Order era
On June 21, 1994, under the New Order of President Suharto (1921–2008), Information Minister Harmoko (1939–2021) banned the publishing of Tempo magazine, along with two other weekly news magazines, Editor and DeTik, citing them as a threat to national stability. In response to the ban, a number of journalists established the Alliance of Independent Journalists (Aliansi Jurnalis Independen). Publication of Tempo resumed following Suharto's departure from office in 1998.

Post New Order era
The magazine has continued its independent position, and on 27 June 2010 published a story about police corruption, based on leaked documents showing that six senior police officers had bank accounts containing millions of dollars, in one case more than US$10 million, on monthly salaries of around US$1600. A few days later (6 July) the magazine's editorial offices in central Jakarta were firebombed by two black-clad men on a motorcycle. Little damage ensued but the attack was widely presumed to be linked to the police.

In the early morning hours on the day the story broke, officials presumed to be connected with the police vainly tried to buy up all the copies of the offending story. Although they purchased 30,000 copies in central Jakarta, no other areas were affected, and vendors doubled the price of the much-in-demand remainder. Tempo simply printed and supplied its distributors with 30,000 replacement copies. The action only added to the publicity surrounding the story.

Tempos previous editor-in-chief is Wahyu Muryadi. Since November 2012, the position has been filled by Arif Zulkifli, the youngest editor in Tempos history.

Tempo has evolved its internet presence with Tempo.co.

Besides the weekly magazine, Tempo also publishes a daily newspaper, Koran Tempo. It provides semi-investigative news about political and economic issues. The newspaper is only published in Indonesian but foreign readers can read other versions, including English, at Tempo.co. Its style of journalism is different from other Indonesian daily newspapers. Tempo provides news in the style of what they call 'the story behind the story'. So, what is served to the readers is not only current events, but also the story following and behind the news.

Magazine
Tempo magazine is published in Indonesian. Starting from 12 September 2000, Tempo has also been published in English. Since its inception, the deputy editor-in-chief of the English edition of Tempo has been Yuli Ismartono, who during Tempo's ban was the vice-president of corporate communications for Freeport Indonesia.

List of editors-in-chief
Goenawan Mohammad (1971–1999)
Bambang Harymurti (1999–2006)
Toriq Hadad (2006–2010)
Wahyu Muryadi (2010–2013)
Arif Zulkifli (2013–2019)
Wahyu Dhyatmika (2019–2021)
Setri Yasra (2021–present)

Notes

External links
  Tempo online 
  Majalah Tempo
  Tempo online, English
  Tempo Magazine, English version

1971 establishments in Indonesia
English-language magazines
Indonesian-language magazines
Magazines established in 1971
News magazines published in Asia
Political magazines published in Indonesia
Weekly news magazines